Soul Glo is an American hardcore punk band from Philadelphia, Pennsylvania. The band is composed of Pierce Jordan (vocals), GG Guerra (bass, programmer), and TJ Stevenson (drums).

History 
Soul Glo formed in 2014. The band was originally a quartet featuring Pierce Jordan, Jamie Sokol, Ethan Brennan and Ruben Polo. In December 2016, the band supported Old Gray on a Northeast US weekend tour, including a Brooklyn show with support from Nine of Swords and a Boston show with support from Really From. In 2018, while the band was on tour, GG Guerra was racial profiled by two white officers in the Missouri State Highway Patrol while on their way to a show in St. Louis, causing the band to cancel shows and start a GoFundMe to post bail and to hire an attorney to sue the officers.

In 2021, the band signed to Epitaph Records followed by the release of volumes 1 & 2 of the DisNigga EP series. In Fall 2021, the band supported Sheer Mag on East Coast US tour, including an appearance on Coheed and Cambria's S.S. Neverender cruise.  

In 2022, Polo was accused of sexual assault by deception, and subsequently stepped down from the band. On March 25, 2022, the band released their album Diaspora Problems via Epitaph. In Summer 2022, the band supported Show Me the Body on the "Half-a-USA" tour alongside Wifigawd. On August 26, 2022, Soul Glo supported My Chemical Romance on their Reunion tour at the PNC Arena alongside Turnstile. In November 2022, the band embarked on a Northeast US co-headlining tour with City of Caterpillar with support from Thirdface.

Style 
The band has been described as a mix of hardcore punk, punk rock and rap rock.

Members

Current members 
 GG Guerra – guitar, programming (2022–present) bass, programming (2017-2022)
 Pierce Jordan – vocals, programming (2014–present)
 TJ Stevenson – drums (2018–present)

Former members 
 Ruben Polo – guitar (2014–2022)
 Jamie Sokol - drums (2014-2018)
 Ethan Brennan - bass (2014-2017)

Touring members 
 Rob Blackwell – bass (2022–present)

Discography

Albums 
 Untitled (2015)
 Untitled LP (2016, SRA Records)
 The Nigga in Me Is Me (2019, SRA Records)
 Diaspora Problems (2022, Epitaph/Secret Voice)

Extended plays 
 Songs to Yeet at the Sun (2020, Secret Voice)
 DisNigga, Vol. 1 (2021, Epitaph)
 DisNigga, Vol. 2 (2021, Epitaph)

Singles 
 "Too Late, Nigger I'm Tired" (2019)
 "(Quietly) Do the Right Thing" (2020)
 "29" (2020)
 "Jump! (Or Get Jumped by the Future!)" (2022)
 "Driponomics" (2022)
 "Gold Chain Punk (whogonbeatmyass?)" (2022)

References

External links 
 Soul Glo

Musical groups established in 2014
Musical groups from Philadelphia
Hardcore punk groups from Pennsylvania
2014 establishments in Pennsylvania
Musical trios